Kuchuma is a town in south-eastern Armenia. It is located in Syunik Province. It is located about 4 km north of Adzhilu.

Other nearby towns and villages include Kavchut (1.3 miles),  Nerkin Giratagh (1.2 miles), Musallam (0.9 miles) and Ajylu (2.5 miles)

See also 
 Lernadzor
 Syunik Province

References

Populated places in Syunik Province